The women's 1,500 metres at the 2012 IPC Athletics European Championships was held at Stadskanaal Stadium from 24–28 July.

Medalists
Results given by IPC Athletics.

Results

T12
Heats

Final

T20
Final

T54
Final

See also
List of IPC world records in athletics

References

1,500 metres
2012 in women's athletics
1500 metres at the World Para Athletics European Championships